Attapol Rithiwattanapong (born 4 May 1980) is a Thai former professional tennis player.

Born in Chonburi, Rithiwattanapong represented Thailand at the 2002 Asian Games, 2003 Summer Universiade and in multiple editions of the Southeast Asian Games.

Rithiwattanapong was a member of the Thailand Davis Cup team in 2003, featuring as a doubles player in ties against South Korea and Uzbekistan, both times partnering Narathorn Srichaphan.

References

External links
 
 
 

1980 births
Living people
Attapol Rithiwattanapong
Attapol Rithiwattanapong
Tennis players at the 2002 Asian Games
Competitors at the 2003 Summer Universiade
Southeast Asian Games medalists in tennis
Attapol Rithiwattanapong
Attapol Rithiwattanapong
Competitors at the 2001 Southeast Asian Games
Competitors at the 2003 Southeast Asian Games
Attapol Rithiwattanapong
Attapol Rithiwattanapong